Mian Volan-e Sofla (also Romanized as Mīān Volān-e Soflá and Mīānvolān-e Soflá) is a village in Doab Rural District, in the Central District of Selseleh County, Lorestan Province, Iran. At the 2006 census, its population was 16, in 4 families.

References 

Towns and villages in Selseleh County